The Congressional Pictorial Directory is a picture directory of leaders and members of the United States Congress and other key officials including the President.  It is published at least once every Congressional Term and is in the public domain.  It was previously published as the Pocket Congressional Directory.

Directories since the 105th Congress (1997–1999) are available online from the Government Publishing Office, Earlier versions as well as printed versions since 1997 are available from most Federal Depository Libraries.  The current version is also available for purchase from the United States Government Printing Office.

Footnotes

Further reading

20th century

1950s

1960s-1970s

1980s-1990s

21st century

External links
 Hathi Trust. Congressional Pictorial Directory, fulltext, various dates; also here
 Government Publishing Office. Congressional Pictorial Directory, fulltext, various dates.
GPO Federal Depository Library Directory, retrieved 2008-02-27

2007 non-fiction books
American non-fiction books
Books about politics of the United States
Books of photographs
Publications of the United States Congress
Reference works in the public domain